Angola Telecom is a telecommunications and Internet service provider of Angola. Angola Telecom is an empresa publica, i.e. wholly owned by the Angolan state.

Subsidiaries of Angola Telecom include: 
Infrasat, offering satellite telecommunications services.
Angola Cables, offering international access for data and voice.
TVCabo, offering broad band cable service for television and radio broadcasting.
Multitel, a portal offering a wide range of internet services.
ELTA, Empresa de Listas Telefonicas de Angola, an online telephone directory.
Movicel, offering mobile telecommunications services.

Angola Telecom created the mobile phone provider Movicel as subsidiary, but holds since 2010 only a minority part of the shares of Movicel.

In 2010 Angola Telecom began a program of restructuring led by a team of international consultants. In 2014, Bloomberg reported that the company was on track to produce its first net profit in over 8 years. However, the economic collapse fueled by the devaluation of crude oil has likely erased any gains achieved thus far.

See also
 MSTelcom telecommunications provider of Sonangol
 Movicel mobile phone provider
 Unitel (Angola) mobile phone provider

External links
Angola Telecom
 ELTAngola
 Multitel
 TVCabo
 Angola Cables
 Infrasat
 Bloomberg article

Telecommunications companies of Angola
Telecommunications companies established in 1992
Angolan brands